The slippery nipple is a layered cocktail shooter most commonly composed of Baileys Irish Cream and sambuca. When prepared properly, the ingredients remain in two distinct visible layers due to the relative densities of the ingredients.

History
The slippery nipple, along with the fuzzy navel, silk panties, and teeny weeny woo woo, was criticized by New York Times writer William Grimes when describing the rise of such schnapps-containing cocktails as "a kind of cult, rallying points for young drinkers in search of fun and not too picky about taste".

Preparation
The drink is made from 1/2 oz. sambuca, 1/2 oz. Irish cream liqueur, and optionally, a drop of grenadine or a cherry. Some versions of the drink replace the sambuca with equal parts of anisette and peppermint schnapps.

References

External links

Barmeister Online Guide to Drinking

Cocktails with liqueur
Shooters (drinks)
Cocktails with Irish cream
Cocktails with anise-flavored liquors